Phoenix is Emil Bulls' fifth major studio and seventh overall studio album. It was released on September 25, 2009. The first single from the record is "When God Was Sleeping". It is the first album recorded with guitarist Andreas Bock as Christian Schneider left the band to pursue personal projects. It was co-produced by Benny Richter and the band.

Track listing 
All songs written by Emil Bulls except where noted.
Lyrics by Christoph von Freydorf.

"Here Comes the Fire" (Christoph von Freydorf) – 4:20
"When God Was Sleeping" – 3:17
"The Architects of My Apocalypse" – 3:15
"Ad Infinitum" – 4:13
"Infecting the Program" – 3:18
"Nothing in This World" – 3:55
"Time" (Christoph von Freydorf) – 3:51
"It's High Time" – 3:29
"The Storm Comes In" – 2:39
"Triumph and Disaster" – 3:53
"Man Overboard! (The Dark Hour of Reason)" – 4:21
"Son of the Morning" – 4:14
"I Don't Belong Here" (Christoph von Freydorf) – 6:01

Limited Edition
"Son of the Morning (Sepalot Remix)" – 3:54
"When God Was a Razorcat (Dunn Ho' Landrock Remix)" – 3:41
"Ad Flamingum (Christ's Flamingo Remix)" – 4:06
"Triumphant Disaster (Cadillac Remix)" – 4:31
"Fire in the Audience (Sin.bios Remix)" – 4:06

Personnel
Christoph von Freydorf – vocals, guitar
James Richardson – bass
Stephan "Moik" Karl – guitar
Fabian "Fab" Fuess – drums
Andreas Bock – guitar, vocals 
Benny Richter - producer, pianos, keyboards
Klaus Scheuermann – mixer, mastering
Toni Meloni – sound engineer, editing
Marco Perdacher - editing
Clemens Nagl - editing
Gerald von Foris – photography
KOMA-Grafik  – artwork

References

Emil Bulls albums
2009 albums
Drakkar Entertainment albums